Saussure is a lunar impact crater. It is located in the crater-riddled terrain in the southern hemisphere of the Moon's near side. Just to the north and nearly attached to the rim is the larger crater Orontius. About a half crater diameter due west is the slightly larger crater Pictet. Just to the east is a curving ridge in the surface, possibly the remains of a crater that has been almost completely overlaid by Saussure.

The outer rim of Saussure is worn but relatively intact, with only the southern edge being somewhat disrupted. A small impact lies across the northeastern rim and a pair of craterlets along the western edge. The inner walls are relatively featureless, and slope down to the generally level interior floor. This bottom surface is marked only by a few tiny craters.

It was named after 18th century Genevan geologist Horace-Bénédict de Saussure. He was the professor, and later colleague and friend of Marc-Auguste Pictet (eponym of nearby Pictet crater).

Satellite craters
By convention these features are identified on lunar maps by placing the letter on the side of the crater midpoint that is closest to Saussure.

References

 
 
 
 
 
 
 
 
 
 
 

Impact craters on the Moon